KAYV (97.1 FM) is a radio station licensed to serve the community of Crested Butte, Colorado. The station is owned by Arkansas Valley Broadcasting, Inc. It airs a classic rock format.

The station was assigned the KAYV call letters by the Federal Communications Commission on September 22, 2011.

References

External links

AYV
Radio stations established in 2012
2012 establishments in Colorado
Classic rock radio stations in the United States
Gunnison County, Colorado